Paul R. Anderson (September 27, 1907 – January 31, 1993) was Temple University's fifth president as well as a former president of Chatham College.

References

Presidents of Temple University
1907 births
1993 deaths
20th-century American academics